Regulator of G-protein signaling 19 is a protein that in humans is encoded by the RGS19 gene.

G proteins mediate a number of cellular processes. The protein encoded by this gene belongs to the RGS (regulators of G-protein signaling) family and specifically interacts with G protein, GAI3. This protein is a guanosine triphosphatase-activating protein that functions to down-regulate Galpha i/Galpha q-linked signaling.

Interactions
RGS19 has been shown to interact with GNAO1, GIPC1, OSTM1, GNAI1, GNAI3 and GNAZ.

References

Further reading

External links